Georgia is represented in the United States House of Representatives by 14 elected representatives, each campaigning and receiving votes in only one district of the 14.

After the 2000 census, the State of Georgia was divided into 13 congressional districts, increasing from 11 due to reapportionment. The state was redistricted again in 2005, and 2007, although the number of districts remained 13. In 2013, the number of representatives increased again with rising population to 14 members.

Current districts and representatives
List of members of the United States House delegation from Georgia, their time in office, district maps, and the district political ratings according to the CPVI. The delegation has a total of 14 members, with nine Republicans and five Democrats as of 2023.

Historical and present district boundaries
Table of United States congressional district boundary maps in the State of Georgia, presented chronologically. All redistricting events that took place in Georgia between 1973 and 2013 are shown.

See also
List of United States congressional districts

References

External links

Current maps and statistics
All links in this section are from the [Georgia Legislative and Congressional Reapportionment Office http://www.legis.ga.gov/joint/reapportionment/en-us/default.aspx] and apply to the maps first used for the 2012 congressional elections.
“Packet” with statewide and regional detail maps as well as various districtwide population statistics
Document providing the county-level population distribution of each district
Document providing the distribution of city populations between districts
Webpage with a statewide map and population statistics; this page is less detailed than the “packet”.
GIS (ESRI) shapefile of the district boundaries
KML (Google Earth) file of the district boundaries
Block equivalency file in CSV format providing the relationships between the districts and the 2010 Census blocks

Maps in the following two sections are of the congressional districts adopted in 2005 and effective for the 2006 elections and the 110th Congress.

2007-2013 statewide maps

Georgia Legislative Reapportionment Services Office (LRSO) statewide map
GeorgiaInfo statewide map (color version)
GeorgiaInfo statewide map (b/w version)

2007-2013 regional detail maps
Georgia LRSO Metro Atlanta area map
Georgia LRSO Savannah area map
Georgia LRSO Augusta and Columbus areas map